The Pan American Squash Championships are the event which serves as the individual Pan American championship for squash players organised by the Federation of Panamerica. The Pan American Championships was first held in 2002.

Past results

Men's championship

Women's championship

Statistics

Men

Women

See also 
 Federation of Panamerica
 Squash at the Pan American Games

External links 
 Federation of Panamerica website
 Pan American Championships 2018 WSF Results
 Pan American Championships 2014 WSF Results
  Pan American Championships 2009 SquashSite Page

References

Squash tournaments
Squash records and statistics